Zamboanga Sibugay, officially the Province of Zamboanga Sibugay (Chavacano: Provincia de Zamboanga Sibugay), is a province in the Philippines located in the Zamboanga Peninsula region in Mindanao. Its capital is Ipil and it borders Zamboanga del Norte to the north, Zamboanga del Sur to the east and Zamboanga City to the southwest. To the south lies Sibuguey Bay in the Moro Gulf.

Zamboanga Sibugay is the 79th province created in the Philippines, when its territories were carved out from the third district of Zamboanga del Sur in 2001.

History

The earliest recorded mention of Sibugay was in Historia de las islas de Mindanao, Jolo y sus adyacentes (1667) by the Spanish priest Francisco Combés, which describes the village of "Sibuguey" along the river Sibuguey.

Zamboanga Sibugay was formerly part of Zamboanga del Sur. Attempts to divide Zamboanga del Sur into two separate provinces date as far back as the 1960s. Several bills were filed in the Philippine Congress, but remained unacted. The new province was finally created by Republic Act No. 8973 signed into law by President Joseph Estrada on November 7, 2000. On February 22, 2001, R.A. 8973 was ratified through a plebiscite conducted in 44 municipalities of Zamboanga del Sur and Pagadian City. Zamboanga del Sur Third District Representative George Hofer was appointed, and later elected as its first governor in 2001.

Government

Presently, former representative Dr. Dulce Ann K. Hofer is the governor of the province, while the representatives of the first and second districts are Wilter Palma and Antonieta "Tata" Eudela, respectively.

Geography
Zamboanga Sibugay covers a total area of  occupying the south-central section of the Zamboanga Peninsula in western Mindanao, at 7°48’N 122°40’E.

To the north it intersects the common municipal boundaries of Kalawit, Tampilisan, and Godod of Zamboanga del Norte. It is bordered to the west by the municipalities of Sirawai, Siocon, and Baliguian, to the south by the Sibuguey Bay, and to the east by the municipalities of Bayog and Kumalarang of Zamboanga del Sur. It is further bordered on the southwest by Zamboanga City.

Climate
The climate of the province is moderately normal (climate type III). The province is situated outside the country's typhoon belt.

Administrative divisions

Zamboanga Sibugay comprises 16 municipalities, organized into two congressional districts and further subdivided into 389 barangays.

NOTE: Municipality with caret symbol (^) marks the province's largest settlement.

Demographics

The vast majority of the people of Zamboanga Sibugay speak Cebuano and Chavacano. Other languages such as Subanen and Tausug, among others, are also spoken, followed by English and Tagalog.

Religion
The province is predominantly Christian. Roman Catholics are the predominant Christians. Various sectarian groups are also present such as Baptists, Born-again Christians, Jehovah's Witnesses, Church of Christ of Latter Day Saints, Iglesia ni Cristo, and Seventh-Day Adventist. Islam comprises about 17% of the population.

Economy

The leading industries are in the areas of semi-processed rubber, rice and corn milling, ordinary food processing, wood and rattan furniture making, dried fish and squid processing, and home-made food processing. New industries include concrete products, garments, wax and candle factories, lime making, and other home and cottage industries.

Major crops produced include rice, corn, coconuts, rubber, fruit trees, vegetables, tobacco, coffee, cacao, and root crops. Livestock and poultry productions are predominantly small-scale and backyard operations. Coal mining in large and small scale and precious metal mining in small scale category are likewise present in some areas of the province.

Tourism
 Rotunda Obelisk
 Provincial Capitol
 Buluan Island

Education

Private schools include:
 
 St. Paul School of Buug
 Dr. Aurelio Mendoza Memorial Colleges (Dr. AMMC)
 Marcelo Spinola School (MSS)
 Marian College (MC)
 Sibugay Technical Institute, Inc. (STII)
 Universidad de Zamboanga (UZ)
 
 Mindanao State University Buug Campus (MSU-BC)
 Saint John College Buug (SJC)
 Medina College Ipil (MC)
 Sibugay Technical Institute, Inc. Imelda Branch (STII)
 Western Mindanao State University (External Studies Unit (ESU)) in the following: Alicia, Diplahan, Imelda, Ipil, Mabuhay, Naga, Olutanga, Siay, Tungawan 

In BUUG, there are two colleges in Buug. One is the government-owned, Mindanao State University - Buug Campus which offers courses in education, liberal arts, agriculture, and aquaculture. It also has a high school which also serves as the laboratory school of the College of Education. The other is the privately owned and medically oriented St. John General Hospital and College, Inc. Another private school, managed by the Sisters of St. Paul of Chartres is also located here, the St. Paul School (formerly Holy Trinity Academy) which offers primary and high school education. The first high school which opened in Buug is Gabaldon Institute which is now called Western Mindanao Institute, another privately owned school. The first technical and vocational school which opened in Buug year 2009 is INTERNACIONAL COLEGIO DE TECNOLOGIA (ICT) which offers courses in Electronics and Communication Technology, Electrical Technology, Information Technology, Hotel and Restaurant Management, Automotive and Metal Technology and now also offers SHS Grade-11 and Grade-12 courses offer in Academic Track in GAS and TVL Track in Industrial Arts strand, ICT strand, and Home Economics Strand. managed by ZALDY MASAYON GUMALANG the School President (SP-GUMALANG).

References

External links

 
 

Online news
 Daily Zamboanga Times
 The Official Website of Zamboanga Today Newspaper

 
Provinces of the Philippines
Provinces of Zamboanga Peninsula
Zamboanga Peninsula
States and territories established in 2001
2001 establishments in the Philippines